{{DISPLAYTITLE:2 31 polytope}}

In 7-dimensional geometry, 231 is a uniform polytope, constructed from the E7 group.

Its Coxeter symbol is 231, describing its bifurcating Coxeter-Dynkin diagram, with a single ring on the end of the 2-node branch.

The rectified 231 is constructed by points at the mid-edges of the 231.

These polytopes are part of a family of 127 (or 27−1) convex uniform polytopes in 7-dimensions, made of uniform polytope facets and vertex figures, defined by all permutations of rings in this Coxeter-Dynkin diagram: .

2_31 polytope

The 231 is composed of 126 vertices, 2016 edges, 10080 faces (Triangles), 20160 cells (tetrahedra), 16128 4-faces (3-simplexes), 4788 5-faces (756 pentacrosses, and 4032 5-simplexes), 632 6-faces (576 6-simplexes and 56 221). Its vertex figure is a 6-demicube.
Its 126 vertices represent the root vectors of the simple Lie group E7.

This polytope is the vertex figure for a uniform tessellation of 7-dimensional space, 331.

Alternate names
 E. L. Elte named it V126 (for its 126 vertices) in his 1912 listing of semiregular polytopes.
 It was called 231 by Coxeter for its bifurcating Coxeter-Dynkin diagram, with a single ring on the end of the 2-node sequence.
 Pentacontihexa-pentacosiheptacontihexa-exon (Acronym laq) - 56-576 facetted polyexon (Jonathan Bowers)

Construction

It is created by a Wythoff construction upon a set of 7 hyperplane mirrors in 7-dimensional space.

The facet information can be extracted from its Coxeter-Dynkin diagram, .

Removing the node on the short branch leaves the 6-simplex. There are 576 of these facets. These facets are centered on the locations of the vertices of the 321 polytope, .

Removing the node on the end of the 3-length branch leaves the 221. There are 56 of these facets. These facets are centered on the locations of the vertices of the 132 polytope, .

The vertex figure is determined by removing the ringed node and ringing the neighboring node. This makes the 6-demicube, 131, .

Seen in a configuration matrix, the element counts can be derived by mirror removal and ratios of Coxeter group orders.

Images

Related polytopes and honeycombs

Rectified 2_31 polytope

The rectified 231 is a rectification of the 231 polytope, creating new vertices on the center of edge of the 231.

Alternate names
 Rectified pentacontihexa-pentacosiheptacontihexa-exon - as a rectified 56-576 facetted polyexon (acronym ) (Jonathan Bowers)

Construction

It is created by a Wythoff construction upon a set of 7 hyperplane mirrors in 7-dimensional space.

The facet information can be extracted from its Coxeter-Dynkin diagram, .

Removing the node on the short branch leaves the rectified 6-simplex, .

Removing the node on the end of the 2-length branch leaves the, 6-demicube,
.

Removing the node on the end of the 3-length branch leaves the rectified 221, .

The vertex figure is determined by removing the ringed node and ringing the neighboring node.

Images

See also
List of E7 polytopes

Notes

References

 H. S. M. Coxeter, Regular Polytopes, 3rd Edition, Dover New York, 1973
 Kaleidoscopes: Selected Writings of H.S.M. Coxeter, edited by F. Arthur Sherk, Peter McMullen, Anthony C. Thompson, Asia Ivic Weiss, Wiley-Interscience Publication, 1995,  
 (Paper 24) H.S.M. Coxeter, Regular and Semi-Regular Polytopes III, [Math. Zeit. 200 (1988) 3-45]
  x3o3o3o *c3o3o3o - laq, o3x3o3o *c3o3o3o - rolaq

7-polytopes